The Canterbury-Bankstown Bulldogs are a professional rugby league club in the National Rugby League (NRL), the premier rugby league football competition in Australia.

Based in Belmore, a suburb of Sydney, the Bulldogs in 1935 were admitted to the New South Wales Rugby League (NSWRL) competition, a predecessor of the current NRL competition.

The Bulldogs won their first premiership in just their fourth season (1938). At the time it made them the quickest club (barring the founding clubs) to win a premiership after admission to the competition, a record which was only recently beaten in 1999 by the Melbourne Storm. They won a second premiership in 1942 but then had to wait another 38 years before breaking through for a third title in 1980. During the 80s, the Bulldogs were a dominant force in the competition appearing in five Grand Finals, winning four of them. In the 90s they featured in the 1995 and 1998 Grand Finals, winning the former. Their most recent success was in 2004 when they beat the Sydney Roosters 16 - 13. The tryscorers were Hazem El Masri and Matt Utai, and the Clive Churchill Medal winner was Willie Mason.

Their eight premiership trophy moved the club into a clear 5th place in the all-time tally.

1ST Grade

Premierships (8)

Runners Up (8)

Minor Premierships (7)

Finals Appearances (34)

2ND Grade/NSW Cup

3RD Grade

President's Cup

Jersey Flegg Cup

Harold Matthews Cup

SG Ball Cup

Club Championships

The Bulldogs won the President's Cup title in 1998; however this title was also considered to be the equivalent of 2nd Grade and as such is listed in both tables.

References

Footnotes

Woods B (2007). El Magic - The Life of Hazem El Masri. Harper Collins Publishing. 
Andrews M (2006). The ABC of Rugby League. ABC Publishing. 
Whiticker A & Hudson G (2005). Canterbury Bulldogs - The Encyclopedia of Rugby League Players. Bas Publishing. 
Whittaker A & Collis I (2004). The History of Rugby League Clubs. 
Lane D (1996). A Family Betrayal - One Man's Super League War - Jarred McCracken. Ironbark Publishing. 
Chesterton R (1996). Good as Gould - Phil Gould's Stormy Life in Football. Ironbark Publishing. 
Lane D (1996). A Family Betrayal - One Man's Super League War - Jarred McCracken. Ironbark Publishing. 
Whiticker A (1992). The Terry Lamb Story. Gary Allen Publishing. 
Tasker N (1988). Top-Dog - The Steve Mortimer Story. Century Hutchinson Publishing.   
Lester G (1985). Berries to Bulldogs. Lester - Townsend Publishing. 
NRL Official Information Handbook (2001-2007). Season Guide.
Middleton D (1987-2006). The Official NSWRL, ARL, NRL Yearbook / Annual.
Christensen EE (1946-1977). NSWRL Yearbook.
Rugby League Review (2003-2007).
Big League (1974-2007).
Rugby League Week (1970-2007).
The Rugby League News.

External links
Official Bulldogs Website
Official Bulldogs Team Store
Bulldogs Statistics
Back to Belmore - The Official Campaign Website

Honours
Rugby league trophies and awards
National Rugby League lists
Sydney-sport-related lists